Grasshopper Club Zürich Frauen is a Swiss women's football team from Niederhasli, Zürich representing Grasshopper Club Zürich in the Swiss Women's Super League.

History

The team was founded in 1977 in Schwerzenbach, Zürich, as DFC Schwerzenbach, the women's football division of SC Schwerzenbach. The team achieved promotion to the top level in 1988 and has played there since. Three years later Schwerzenbach won its first trophy, the 1992 national cup, and in 1999 it won the championship. FFC Bern prevented a double defeating Schwerzenbach in the cup's final in a penalty shootout.

While the team's standings subsequently ranged between the 3rd and second-to-last spots, Schwerzenbach won two more national cups in 2003 and 2008 and represented Switzerland in the 2004 European Cup. In 2006, the team decided to become its own club and on 6 October, 2006, FFC United Schwerzenbach was founded in Greifensee, Zürich. 

In May 2008, the club won its first title, with the cup victory over FFC Bern. Soon after, in June 2008, the collaboration between Grasshopper Club Zürich and FFC United Schwerzenbach was announced and in the following season the team played as GC/Schwerzenbach. This collaboration was seen as a quantum leap in women's football in Switzerland. GC/Schwerzenbach was dissolved a year later, as the team became fully integrated into Grasshopper Club as the women's football division. They would play under the name Grasshopper Club Zürich. 

Following a bronze in its debut season, Grasshopper was the championship's runner-up in 2010. In the three next seasons it has ended in mid-table positions.

Titles
 Swiss League (1)
 1999
 Swiss Cup (3)
 1992, 2003, 2008

Current squad

Former internationals
  Switzerland: Malin Gut, Caroline Müller, Marina Keller, Sheila Lossli, Bea Mettler, Isabelle Meyer, Jasmin Schnyder, Daniela Schwarz, Selina Zumbühl, Manuela Zürcher

Competition record

UEFA record

Overall record

References

Women's football clubs in Switzerland
Women
Association football clubs established in 1974
Sport in Zürich
1974 establishments in Switzerland